Sierra de Velasco is a mountain range in the Argentine province of La Rioja. Sierra de Velsco runs from north to south just west of the city of La Rioja and east of Chilecito.

Landforms of La Rioja Province, Argentina
Mountain ranges of Argentina
Sierras Pampeanas